The little native mouse (Pseudomys delicatulus), also known as the delicate mouse, is a species of rodent in the family Muridae. The Kunwinjku people of western Arnhem Land call this little creature kijbuk.

It is found in Western Australia, the Northern Territory, Queensland, New South Wales and Papua New Guinea.

Description and behaviour 
The little native mouse has fur that is yellow-brown to grey-brown above and white underneath. It is the smallest of all Australian native mice with a head and body length of 55–75 mm with adults of both sexes being roughly the same in size, weight (6–15 g) and colour. In Arnhem Land, the only place the species has been studied at length, breeding takes place in July and August. Two to four young are born in a grass-lined nesting chamber after a gestation of 28–31 days. At birth the eyes are shut and the ears tightly folded back, they develop quickly and are independent of the mother around four weeks of age.

Habitat 
The species is found in sandy, well drained, sparsely covered savanna. The animal lives in hollow logs, under pieces of bark, or in burrows, the design of which varies with local conditions: in hard granite sand ridges the burrow is shallow, intricately constructed retreats with many false passages and one main nesting chamber; in sandy conditions the burrows are deep simple structures around two metres long and with only one main chamber. It occasionally excavates burrows in termite mounds.

Diet 
Grass seeds from native grasses comprise most of their diet.

References

Pseudomys
Mammals of Western Australia
Mammals of the Northern Territory
Mammals of New South Wales
Mammals of Queensland
Rodents of Australia
Mammals described in 1842
Taxonomy articles created by Polbot
Rodents of New Guinea